Peck Mounds (16 CT 1) is an archaeological site of the Late Troyville-Early Coles Creek culture (650 to 860 CE) in Catahoula Parish, Louisiana.

Description
The earthwork mounds are located in the vicinity of the Ferry Place Plantation house. The archeological site consists of five mounds, but one is no longer visible above ground. The site is situated on Maçon Ridge and overlooks Lake Lovelace. 

It was added to the NRHP on August 29, 1980 as part of the Ferry Place National Register District, NRIS number 80001711. James A. Ford mentioned this site in 1933, when he conducted archeological investigations at the nearby Peck Village Site.

See also
Culture, phase, and chronological table for the Mississippi Valley

References

External links
 Ferry Place

Troyville culture
Archaeological sites of the Coles Creek culture
Mounds in Louisiana
Geography of Catahoula Parish, Louisiana